Whitemouth Island Ecological Reserve is an ecological reserve which is the largest island of Whitemouth Lake in Manitoba. It was established in 1999 under the Manitoba Ecological Reserves Act. The island is the most western example of a largely undisturbed deciduous forest of the St. Lawrence - Great Lakes region in Canada. It contains eight examples of eastern deciduous plants that are considered rare in Manitoba such as Dutchman's Breeches, green adder's mouth, blue cohosh, New Jersey tea, and enchanter's nightshade.

See also
 List of ecological reserves in Manitoba
 List of protected areas of Manitoba

References

External links
 Whitemouth Island Ecological Reserve, Backgrounder
 iNaturalist: Whitemouth Island Ecological Reserve

Protected areas established in 1999
Ecological reserves of Manitoba
Eastman Region, Manitoba
Nature reserves in Manitoba
Protected areas of Manitoba